Josephs is an English surname, and may refer to

 Robert Josephs (born 1961), American Professor of Psychology
 Moeneeb Josephs (born 1980), South African footballer
 Wilfred Josephs (1927–1997), English composer
 Margaret Josephs (born 1947), American former reality television personality.

See also
 Joseph (surname)
 Josephson